(Chữ Nôm: 渃㴨) is a common name for a variety of Vietnamese "dipping sauces" that are served quite frequently as condiments. It is commonly a sweet, sour, salty, savoury and/or spicy sauce.

(mixed fish sauce) is the most well known dipping sauce made from fish sauce. Its simplest recipe is some lime juice, or occasionally vinegar, one part fish sauce, one part sugar and two parts water.

Otherwise, when having seafood, such as eels, people also serve some slices of lemongrass.

It is often prepared hot on a stove to dissolve the sugar more quickly, then cooled.  The flavor can be varied depending on the individual's preference, but it is generally described as pungent and distinct, sweet yet sour, and sometimes spicy.

Varieties by region

People in the north of Vietnam tend to use , as cooked by using the above recipes, but add broth made from pork loin and penaeid shrimp. In the central section of the country, people like using a less dilute form of  that has the same proportions of fish sauce, lime, and sugar as the recipe above, but less water, and with fresh chili. Southern Vietnamese people often use palm sugar and coconut water as the sweetener.

Uses 

 is typically served with:

 , a rice dish with meat, poultry, eggs, seafood or vegetables. The toppings are often fried, grilled, braised, steamed/boiled, or stir-fried.
 , spring rolls
  or "rice rolls", where wide sheets of rice noodles rolled up, and topped (or stuffed) with stir-fried or braised meat or seafood, with soy sauce or fish sauce
 , a pan-fried crêpe made from rice flour and coconut milk, and filled with pork, shrimp, onion and bean sprouts, and topped with herbs
 , rice noodles with meat, poultry, eggs, seafood or vegetables. The toppings are often fried, grilled, braised, steamed/boiled, or stir-fried.

See also
 List of dips
 List of sauces

References
 Vietnam—Nuoc Cham recipe (Chili, Garlic, and Fish Sauce)

Vietnamese cuisine
Sauces